Pan Am Flight 103 was a flight that was destroyed in 1988 by a terrorist bomb, killing all 259 people on board, plus 11 on the ground.

Flight 103 may also refer to:

 Air New Zealand Flight 103, an Air New Zealand DC-10 which helped to find a lost Cessna in the Pacific Ocean in 1978
 Far Eastern Air Transport Flight 103, a Boeing 737 that broke up in midair over Taiwan in 1981, killing all 110 on board, but no one on the ground
 , a Beechcraft 1900C that crashed on final approach to Homer Airport in 1987, killing 19 of the 21 on board
 Copterline Flight 103, a Sikorsky S-76C+ helicopter that crashed into the Gulf of Finland in 2005, killing all 14 on board
 Yeti Airlines Flight 103, a De Havilland Canada DHC-6 Twin Otter that crashed on final approach to Tenzing-Hillary Airport in 2008, killing 18 of the 19 on board
 Buddha Air Flight 103, a Beechcraft 1900D which crashed on approach to Tribhuwan International Airport, Kathmandu, Nepal in 2011, killing all 19 on board

0103